Spectre is Skiz Fernando, head of the Wordsound label, in his record producer, rapper and electronica artist persona.

Career
He is known for dark, brooding compositions inspired by illbient, trip hop, industrial music, and horror films, and has been described as "the Nosferatu of underground horrorcore".  His first album was The Illness (1995), which drew comparisons with the Wu-Tang Clan and Lee "Scratch" Perry, and cemented his reputation in the musical community. He soon began collaborating with Prince Paul (on his Psychoanalysis album), Techno Animal (Vs Reality), Sensational (on Spectre's 2001 album Parts Unknown), and others.

Spectre also released a 90-minute mixtape, RuffKutz, which showcased his new label, Black Hoodz, and featured  tracks by Dr. Israel, Sensational, Mr. Dead, and the Jungle Brothers. His second album, The Second Coming was released in 1998, with a third, The End following in 2000.

Psychic Wars was released in 2003, with reviewer Mason Jones commenting "Spectre's world is a dark, dank back alley, with echoes of doom-laden bass pulses and the distant clanks and thuds of a factory on the outskirts of town". German magazine Skug described the album as "Gnackwat for the brain cells". The album featured vocals from Honeychild and was mixed by Pere Ubu's Tony Maimone.

Crooked 
In 2000 while visiting family in Sri Lanka, Fernando wrote the script for a movie called Crooked.  The film was shot in 25 days in April 2001 then edited and put through post production through the summer and winter of the same year.  It was released on the Wordsound label as a soundtrack and a two disc DVD set in 2002.

Other aliases 
The Eye
The Ill Saint / Tha Ill Saint
Minister Fernando
Wordsound I-Powa
Slotek
Skza
SK1

Discography

Film
Several tracks from The Illness and The Second Coming were used in the film The Mindscape of Alan Moore.

References

External links
Wordsound Official Website

American rappers
American record producers
Living people
Year of birth missing (living people)
Place of birth missing (living people)
21st-century American rappers
American people of Sri Lankan descent